This is a partial list of French sportspeople. For the full plain list of French sportspeople on Wikipedia, see :Category:French sportspeople.

Alpine skiing

Émile Allais
Sébastien Amiez
François Bonlieu
Didier Bouvet
Charles Bozon
Joël Chenal
James Couttet
Jean-Luc Crétier
Danièle Debernard
Antoine Dénériaz
Annie Famose
Christine Goitschel
Marielle Goitschel
Jean-Claude Killy
Léo Lacroix
Florence Masnada
Carole Merle
Isabelle Mir
Steve Missillier
Carole Montillet
Henri Oreiller
Perrine Pelen
Guy Périllat
Laure Pequegnot
Franck Piccard
Alexis Pinturault
Florence Steurer
Jean-Pierre Vidal
Jean Vuarnet

Association football 

Christophe Ajas
Bruno Audebrand
Guillaume Benon (born 1975), defender
Denis Bourdoncle (born 1964), defender
Cyril Cassese (born 1972), forward
David Castilla (born 1977), goalkeeper
Fabrice Catherine (born 1973), goalkeeper
David Chevallereau (born 1969), goalkeeper 
Sylvain Chomlafel (born 1966), forward
Emmanuel Clément (born 1971), midfielder 
Bertrand Gallou (born 1974), goalkeeper
Thierry Henry (born 1977), forward
Zinedine Zidane (born 1972), forward

Badminton
 Maxime Mora

Biathlon

Sandrine Bailly
Patrice Bailly-Salins
Florence Baverel-Robert
Jean-Guillaume Béatrix
Sylvie Becaert
Anne Briand
Marie-Laure Brunet
Ferréol Cannard
Véronique Claudel
Vincent Defrasne
Marie Dorin Habert
Thierry Dusserre
Hervé Flandin
Martin Fourcade
Delphyne Heymann
Lionel Laurent
Vincent Jay
Gilles Marguet
Corinne Niogret
Delphyne Peretto
Raphaël Poirée
Julien Robert

Bobsleigh
Emmanuel Hostache
Éric Le Chanony
Bruno Mingeon
Max Robert

Cross-country skiing

Roddy Darragon
Robin Duvillard
Jean-Marc Gaillard
Maurice Manificat
Ivan Perrillat Boiteux

Curling
Georges André
Armand Bénédic
Pierre Canivet
Henri Cournollet

Figure skating

Marina Anissina
Andrée Brunet
Pierre Brunet
Alain Calmat
Philippe Candeloro
Jacqueline du Bief
Isabelle Duchesnay
Paul Duchesnay
Gwendal Peizerat
Patrick Péra

Freestyle skiing
Olivier Allamand
Arnaud Bovolenta
Jean-Frédéric Chapuis
Sébastien Foucras
Richard Gay
Edgar Grospiron
Marion Josserand
Sandra Laoura
Marie Martinod
Jonathan Midol
Kevin Rolland

Ice hockey
Nicolas Arrossamena
Yohann Auvitu
Pierre-Édouard Bellemare
Eliot Berthon
Sébastien Bordeleau
Philippe Bozon
Stéphane Da Costa
Teddy Da Costa
Ludovic Garreau
Laurent Gras
Kévin Hecquefeuille
Cristobal Huet
Laurent Meunier
Robert Ouellet
Xavier Ouellet
Christian Pouget
Antoine Roussel
Thomas Roussel
François Rozenthal
Maurice Rozenthal

Judo
Marc Alexandre
Larbi Benboudaoud
Djamel Bouras
Jean-Claude Brondani
Bruno Carabetta
Christine Cicot
Jean-Paul Coche
Bertrand Damaisin
Benjamin Darbelet
Lucie Décosse
Frédéric Demontfaucon
David Douillet
Gévrise Émane
Catherine Fleury-Vachon
Christophe Gagliano
Priscilla Gneto
Céline Lebrun
Ugo Legrand
Nathalie Lupino
Laetitia Meignan
Jean-Jacques Mounier
Cécile Nowak
Michel Nowak
Automne Pavia
Stéphanie Possamaï
Marie-Claire Restoux
Teddy Riner
Pascal Tayot
Audrey Tcheuméo
Stéphane Traineau
Séverine Vandenhende
Patrick Vial

Race car drivers
Laurent Aïello
Jean Alesi
René Arnoux
Jean Behra
Jean-Pierre Beltoise
Jules Bianchi
Sébastien Bourdais
Julien Canal
François Cevert
Patrick Depailler
Dominique Dupuy
Loïc Duval
Pierre Gasly
Yves Giraud-Cabantous
Romain Grosjean
Jean-Pierre Jabouille
Jacques Laffite
Guy Ligier
Sébastien Loeb
Cathy Muller
Michèle Mouton
Esteban Ocon
Olivier Panis
Charles Pic
Didier Pironi
Alain Prost
Jean-Louis Schlesser
Philippe Streiff
Patrick Tambay
Jean Todt
Benoît Tréluyer
Maurice Trintignant
Jean-Éric Vergne

Professional wrestling
André the Giant

Nordic combined
Nicolas Bal
Sylvain Guillaume
Fabrice Guy
Jason Lamy-Chappuis
Ludovic Roux

Short track speed skating
Stéphanie Bouvier
Maxime Chataignier
Thibaut Fauconnet
Choi Min-kyung
Veronique Pierron

Ski jumping
Coline Mattel
Baljeet

Snowboarding
Déborah Anthonioz
Mathieu Bozzetto
Isabelle Blanc
Paul-Henri de Le Rue
Tony Ramoin
Karine Ruby
Chloé Trespeuch
Pierre Vaultier
Doriane Vidal

Speed skating
Alexis Contin
Ewen Fernandez
Benjamin Macé

Swimming

Yannick Agnel
Coralie Balmy
Alain Bernard
Joseph Bernardo
Jean Boiteux
Charlotte Bonnet
Gilbert Bozon
Frédérick Bousquet
Kiki Caron
Stéphan Caron
René Cornu
Frédéric Delcourt
Hugues Duboscq
Aldo Eminente
Franck Esposito
Ophélie-Cyrielle Étienne
Solenne Figuès
Fabien Gilot
Alexandre Jany
Clément Lefert
Amaury Leveaux
Grégory Mallet
Florent Manaudou
Laure Manaudou
Roxana Maracineanu
Malia Metella
Alain Mosconi
Camille Muffat
Catherine Plewinski
Catherine Poirot
Boris Steimetz
Jérémy Stravius
Jean Taris
Georges Vallerey, Jr.

Taekwondo
Myriam Baverel
Gwladys Épangue
Pascal Gentil
Anne-Caroline Graffe
Marlène Harnois

Tennis

Pierre Albarran
Paul Aymé
Jean-Claude Barclay
Pierre Barthès
Marion Bartoli
Julien Benneteau
Marcel Bernard
François Blanchy
Jean Borotra
Christian Boussus
Marguerite Broquedis
Jacques Brugnon
Albert Canet
Gail Chanfreau
Arnaud Clément
Henri Cochet
Comtesse de Kermel
Georges de la Chapelle
Élisabeth d'Ayen
Nathalie Dechy
Max Decugis
Bernard Destremau
Arnaud Di Pasquale
Françoise Dürr
Richard Gasquet
Maurice Germot
Kate Gillou
P. Girod
André Gobert
Tatiana Golovin
Julie Halard-Decugis
René Lacoste
Nelly Landry
Henri Leconte
Suzanne Lenglen
Michaël Llodra
Adine Masson
Doris Metaxa
Jeanne Matthey
Simonne Mathieu
Amélie Mauresmo
Édouard Mény de Marangue
Kristina Mladenovic
Yannick Noah
Lolette Payot
Yvon Petra
Mary Pierce
André Prévost
Hélène Prévost
Laurent Riboulet
Colette Rosambert
Fabrice Santoro
Jean-Pierre Samazeuilh
Jean Schopfer
Jo-Wilfried Tsonga
André Vacherot
Michel Vacherot
Édouard Roger-Vasselin
Julie Vlasto

Monfils

See also
Sport in France
France at the Olympics
France at the Paralympics

France
 
Sports